Anthidium semicirculare is a species of bee in the family Megachilidae, the leaf-cutter, carder, or mason bees.

Synonyms
Synonyms for this species include:
Anthidium (Anthidium) incurvatum_homonym Pasteels, 1980

References

semicirculare
Insects described in 1985